Arevashat known as Varmaziar until 1946, is a village in the Armavir Province of Armenia.

Gallery

See also 
Armavir Province

References 

World Gazeteer: Armenia – World-Gazetteer.com

Populated places in Armavir Province